The 1st Ohio Sharpshooters Battalion was an irregular sharpshooter battalion in the Union Army during the American Civil War.

Service
The 1st Ohio Sharpshooters Battalion was organized from four independent companies of sharpshooters and served at the headquarters of Generals William S. Rosecrans and George H. Thomas, commanders of the Army and Department of the Cumberland, March 1863 through July 1865.

The 5th Independent Company Sharpshooters was organized at Camp Cleveland in Cleveland, Ohio, and mustered on February 25, 1863, and mustered out July 19, 1865.  This company was also known as Barber's Sharpshooters.

The 6th Independent Company Sharpshooters was organized at Camp Cleveland, Ohio, and mustered on December 30, 1862, and mustered out July 19, 1865.  This company was also known as Coe's Sharpshooters and Thomas' Bodyguard.

The 7th Independent Company Sharpshooters was organized at Camp Cleveland, Ohio, and mustered on January 27, 1863, and mustered out July 28, 1865. This company also served at the headquarters of General William T. Sherman, commander of the Military Division Mississippi, May 20, 1864, to July 17, 1865. This company was also known as Squire's Sharpshooters and Sherman's Bodyguard.

The 8th Independent Company Sharpshooters was organized at Camp Dennison near Cincinnati, Ohio, March 9, 1863, and mustered out July 19, 1865.  This company was also known as Barton's Sharpshooters.

The August 10, 1863, returns for the unit show a total strength of 129 men.

The unit suffered losses of 4 enlisted men killed or died of wounds, and 58 enlisted men dying of disease or accident, total 62 deaths in service.

Commanders
 Captain Gershom M. Barber – commanded at the battle of Chickamauga

See also

 List of Ohio Civil War units
 Ohio in the Civil War

References
 Dyer, Frederick H. A Compendium of the War of the Rebellion (Des Moines, IA:  Dyer Pub. Co.), 1908.
 Ohio Roster Commission. Official Roster of the Soldiers of the State of Ohio in the War on the Rebellion, 1861–1865 (Akron, OH: Werner Co.), 1886–1895.
 Reid, Whitelaw. Ohio in the War: Her Statesmen, Her Generals, and Soldiers (Cincinnati: Moore, Wilstach, & Baldwin), 1868.
Attribution

Footnotes

External links
 Ohio in the Civil War: 5th Ohio Independent Company Sharpshooters by Larry Stevens
 Ohio in the Civil War: 6th Ohio Independent Company Sharpshooters by Larry Stevens
 Ohio in the Civil War: 7th Ohio Independent Company Sharpshooters by Larry Stevens
 Ohio in the Civil War: 8th Ohio Independent Company Sharpshooters by Larry Stevens

Military units and formations established in 1863
Military units and formations disestablished in 1865
Units and formations of the Union Army from Ohio
Sharpshooter units and formations of the American Civil War
1863 establishments in Ohio